The La Última Mision World Tour is the farewell concert tour by reggaeton duo Wisin & Yandel to support their final studio album La Última Misión (2022). The tour commenced on May 27, 2022 in Medellin, Colombia and is set to end on December 31, 2022 in San Juan, Puerto Rico. The tour consists of two legs, the first in Latin America and the second leg includes 28 shows in United States and Canada and it is set to conclude with a record-breaking 14 consecutive shows at José Miguel Agrelot Coliseum in Puerto Rico.

Tour dates

Notes

References 

2022 concert tours
Reggaeton duos
Farewell concert tours